Dival may refer to:
 Dival, Afghanistan
 Dival, Hormozgan, Iran
 Dival, Sistan and Baluchestan, Iran